= Joseph Lippman Nogee =

- Born: June 16, 1929; Schenectady, New York, United States
- Died: July 11, 2023 (aged 94); Harris County, Texas, United States
- Occupations: Historian; Author

Joseph Lippman Nogee (16 Jun 1929 – 11 Jul 2023) was an American historian, academic and author. He specialized in the history of the society of the Soviet Union.

== Biography ==
He was born June 16, 1929, in Schenectady, New York, and died in Houston, Texas on July 11, 2023. He was married to Jo Nabors Nogee and had one daughter and a son.

== Education ==
He completed his bachelor’s degree in foreign service from Georgetown University. He completed his master’s degree in history from the University of Chicago and his Ph.D. in international relations from Yale University.

== Career ==
He joined the senior faculty of the Department of Political Science at the University of Houston in 1958, where he served as a professor for 46 years.

He was promoted to the rank of Emeritus Professor in 1999. He was also a stamp collector and classical music enthusiast.

== Bibliography ==
He is the author of a number of notable books:

- Soviet Foreign Policy Since World War II
- Man, State, and society in the Soviet Union
